Maria of Nassau-Dillenburg (1568-1625) was a daughter of Count John VI "the Elder" of Nassau-Dillenburg and his first wife, Countess Elisabeth of Leuchtenberg.

Maria married John Louis I, Count of Nassau-Wiesbaden-Idstein in 1588 and was the mother of:
 Margaretha (1589-1660), married in 1606 to Adolph of Bentheim
 Anna Catharina (1590-1622), married in 1607 to Count Simon VII "the Pious" of Lippe
 Juliana (1593-1605)
 John Philip (1595-1599)
 John Louis II (1596-1605).

House of Nassau
Countesses of Nassau
1568 births
1625 deaths
16th-century German people
17th-century German people
Daughters of monarchs